The Council of Lyon may refer to a number of synods or councils of the Roman Catholic Church, held in Lyon, France or in nearby Anse.

Previous to 1313, a certain Abbé Martin counted twenty-eight synods or councils held at Lyons
or at Anse.

Some of these synods include:
 Synod of Lyon (before 523), at which eleven of the members of the Synod of Epaone (517) were present
 Synod of Lyon (567), in the presence of Pope John III and during which bishops Salonius of Embrun and Sagittarius of Gap were condemned
First Council of Lyon (1245; Pope Innocent IV; regarding the Crusades)
Second Council of Lyon (1274; Pope Gregory X; regarding union with the Eastern Orthodox and other matters)

References

Lyon